X Games Asia, also called the KIA X Games Asia or World Extreme Games is a sports event which focuses on Extreme sports. The inaugural World Extreme Games were held in Phuket, Thailand in 1998. They were held in Phuket until 2001, Kuala Lumpur from 2002 to 2004, Seoul in 2005 and in Shanghai 2014 to 2015.

Aggressive inline skating was still included in the X Games in Asia.

Between 2016 and 2018 there were no games in Asia but in 2019 the games were back in Shanghai. In 2020 there will be the first ever Winter X Games in Asia. The event was to take place February 21–23 at the Secret Garden ski resort in Chongli district within the city of Zhangjiakou, which also served as the 2022 Winter Olympics ski snowboard events host venue.

Results

1998

1999

2000

2001

Norwin Caluya Gold Medalist Skateboard street and vert

2002

2003

2004
5TH ANNUAL JUNIOR ASIAN X GAMES 2004
Name: Anjou Jellicoe G. Mauricio 
Award: Skateboard Park Best Trick Gold Medalist.

2005
BMX Flatland 
1st - Muhammad Afiq bin Saifuddin - MAS

2006
Ogawa Tomoko lands a gold medal for Rock Climbing.

2007

2008

2009
Quarter Final-Malaysia
Semi Final-China
Final-Japan

2010

2011

2012
Tom Schaar lands 1080 and becomes the youngest to win the x games gold medal

2013

2014
Inline skater Jeerasak Tassorn won gold medal at the 2014 X Games Asia. His performance set numerous street roller blading records.

2015

Asian X-Tour 
Qualifying rounds.

2000
Asian X-Tour Singapore.
Aggressive In-Line Skating.
2nd - Lewis Lee (Pee)

2001

2002 
Asian X-Tour Singapore (6-8 Dec 2002).
Aggressive In-Line Skating. [MAIN-X] 2nd - Lewis Lee (Pee)

2003 
Asian X-Tour Singapore (13-15 Jun 2003).
Aggressive In-Line Skating.
[MAIN-X AIL PARK] 1st - Lewis Lee (Pee)

References

External links
 

Recurring sporting events established in 1998
X Games
Multi-sport events in Asia